Dhaher al-Aryani (born 11 December 1972 in Ras al-Khaimah) is an Emirati trap shooter. He competed in the trap event at the 2012 Summer Olympics and placed 32nd in the qualification round.

References

1972 births
Living people
Emirati male sport shooters
Olympic shooters of the United Arab Emirates
Shooters at the 2012 Summer Olympics
People from the Emirate of Ras Al Khaimah